The Borkoldoy Too is a range in the Internal Tien-Shan. It stretches for a length of 90 km with the highest elevation of 5,170 m.

References

Mountain ranges of Kyrgyzstan
Mountain ranges of the Tian Shan